Heald Green is a suburb in the Metropolitan Borough of Stockport, Greater Manchester, England. In the south-west of the borough, near Manchester Airport and within the boundaries of the historic county of Cheshire, it is bordered by Gatley and Cheadle to the north, Cheadle Hulme to the east, Handforth and Styal to the south and Moss Nook and Peel Hall to the west.

Heald Green railway station, on the Styal Line, is linked by a spur to Manchester Airport station.

Population
At the 2001 Census, Heald Green had a population of 12,640, of whom 6,520 (51.6%) were female and 6,120 (48.4%) male, 2,494 (19.7%) aged 16 and under and 2,409 (19.1%) aged 65 and over.

Ethnicity
Ethnic white groups (British, Irish, other) account for 90.4% (11,440 people) of the population, with 9.6% (1200 people) being in ethnic groups other than white. Of the 9.6% (1200 people) in non-white ethnic groups:
144 (12%) belonged to mixed ethnic groups
881 (73.4%)  were Asian or Asian British
47 (3.9%) were Black or Black British
128 (10.7%) were Chinese or other ethnic groups

Religion
Christian – 77.1% (9,741 people)
Buddhist – 0.2% (23 people)
Hindu – 1% (126 people)
Jewish – 0.8% (106 people)
Muslim – 6.1% (770 people)
Sikh – 0.2% (20 people)
Other religions – 0.3% (43 people)
No religion – 8.3% (1,089 people)
Religion not stated – 5.7% (722 people)

Notable people
Famous residents have included world snooker champion Alex Higgins, Lancashire cricket players Johnny Briggs and Clive Lloyd, Sarah Harding from Girls Aloud, Coronation Street's Simon Gregson, Manchester City players Paul Dickov and Derek Jeffries and 1990s band Northern Uproar.

External links
Heald Green Heritage local history website

See also

 Listed buildings in Cheadle and Gatley

References

Geography of the Metropolitan Borough of Stockport